Tyler Reed (born 19 August 1988) is an American swimmer who swam for the University of Kentucky. Tyler was a member of the 2012 FINA World Championship Swimming Team competing for the United States. He was a medalist on the Men's 4 × 100 metre freestyle relay for team USA.  Tyler was a member of the 2013 World University Games Swimming Team competing for the United States.  Tyler swam in the semi-finals of the 100 Freestyle at the 2013 WUGs.

References

External links

1988 births
Living people
American male swimmers
Medalists at the FINA World Swimming Championships (25 m)
Kentucky Wildcats men's swimmers
Sportspeople from Bowling Green, Kentucky
People from Morgantown, Kentucky
People from Butler County, Kentucky
Competitors at the 2013 Summer Universiade